The Omani Empire was a maritime empire, vying with Portugal and Britain for trade and influence in the Persian Gulf and Indian Ocean. At its peak in the 19th century, Omani influence or control extended across the Strait of Hormuz to modern-day Iran and Pakistan, and as far south as Cape Delgado. After the death of Said bin Sultan in 1856 the empire was divided between his sons into two sultanates, an African section (Sultanate of Zanzibar) ruled by Majid bin Said and an Asian section (Sultanate of Muscat and Oman) ruled by Thuwaini bin Said.

History

Becoming a regional power 
Muscat, which is located in a strategic location on trade routes, came under the control of the Portuguese Empire between 1507 and 1650. However, the Portuguese did not succeed in controlling Oman in its entirety. In mid-17th century, the Omani tribes were able to end the Portuguese presence in Muscat.

In the year 1696, under the reign of Saif bin Sultan, an Omani fleet attacked Mombasa, besieging the Portuguese Fort Jesus, in which 2,500 civilians had taken refuge. The siege of the fort ended after 33 months when the garrison dying of hunger surrendered to the Omanis. By 1783, the Omani Empire had expanded eastwards to Gwadar in present-day Pakistan. The Omanis also continued attacking Portuguese bases in western India but failed to conquer any. In the north, the Omanis moved into the Persian Gulf, taking Bahrain from the Persians, holding it for several years. The expansion of Omani power and influence southwards included the first large-scale settlement of Zanzibar by Omani migrants.

Ya'rubid Dynasty 

The agriculture in Oman had undergone a massive improvement under Saif bin Sultan. He is known for providing water to the interior lands of Oman, while he encouraged Omani Arabs to move from the interior and settle along the coast by planting date palms in the coastal Al Batinah Region. The town in the interior of Oman, Al Hamra, has its irrigation system improved by the new built large falaj, it seems that the Yaruba dynasty supported major investment in settlement and agricultural works such as terracing along the Wadi Bani Awf. Saif bin Sultan built new schools. He made the castle of Rustaq his residence, adding the Burj al Riah wind tower.

Saif bin Sultan died on 4 October 1711. He was buried in the castle of Rustaq in a luxurious tomb, later destroyed by a Wahhabi general. At his death he had great wealth, said to include 28 ships, 700 male slaves and one third of Oman's date trees. He was succeeded by his son. Sultan bin Saif II (r. 1711–1718) established his capital at Al-Hazm on the road from Rustaq to the coast. Now just a village, there still are remains of a great fortress that he built around 1710, and which contains his tomb.

Alliance with Great Britain 
Sultan bin Ahmad assumed control of the government after the death of his nephew and strengthened the already powerful fleet by adding numerous gunships and sleek cargo vessels, he also needed a strong ally to help him regain control of Mombasa from the Mazrui clan, fight off the movement spreading from what is now Saudi Arabia and to keep the Qasimi tribes from the Persian city of Lengeh out of Oman. He found this able ally in Great Britain, which in the late 18th century was at war with France and knew that the French emperor, Napoleon Bonaparte, was planning to march through Persia and capture Muscat on his way to invade India. In 1798 Britain and Oman agreed on a Treaty of Commerce and Navigation.

Sultan bin Ahmad pledged himself to British interests in India, and his territories became out of bounds to the French. He allowed the British East India Company to establish the first trading station in the Persian Gulf, and a British consul was posted to Muscat. As well as defeating Bonaparte, the British had another motive for the treaty with Oman: they wanted to put pressure on the sultan to end slavery, which had been declared illegal in England in 1772. At this time, the trade from Africa to Oman was still buoyant, and Zanzibar's position as an important trade centre was bolstered further when the supply of ivory from Mozambique to India collapsed because of excessive Portuguese export duties. The traders simply shipped their ivory through Zanzibar instead. Omani warships were in constant skirmishes up and down the gulf, which kept Sultan preoccupied. It was in the course of one of his sorties during an incursion abroad a ship in the Persian Gulf in 1804 that Sayyid Sultan was shot in the head by a stray bullet. He was buried in Lengeh.

Relations with the United States of America 
On 21 September 1833 a historic treaty of friendship and trade was signed with the United States of America. It was the second trade treaty formulated by the U.S. and an Arab state (Morocco being the first in 1820). The United States and Oman both stood to benefit, as the U.S. – unlike Britain and France – had no territorial ambitions in the Middle East and was solely interested in commerce. On 13 April 1840, the ship Al-Sultanah docked at New York, making it the first Arab envoy to ever visit the New World. Her crew of fifty-six Arab sailors caused a flurry of excitement among the three hundred thousand residents of that thriving metropolis. Al-Sultanah carried ivory, Persian rugs, spices, coffee and dates, as well as lavish gifts for President Martin Van Buren. The visit of Al-Sultanah lasted nearly four months, in which time the emissary, Ahmad bin Na'aman Al Kaabi, the first Arab emissary to visit the United States (whose portrait can still be seen in the Oman and Zanzibar display of the Peabody Essex Museum in Massachusetts) and his officers were entertained by state and city dignitaries. They received resolutions passed by official bodies, were given tours of New York City and saw sections which would, a few decades later, become colonies of Arabic-speaking immigrants. Among Bin Na'aman's hosts was Commodore Cornelius Vanderbilt, in whose home he met Governor William H. Seward and Vice President Richard Mentor Johnson. The visit of Al Kaabi to America was a happy one, and when he prepared to leave, the United States completely repaired Al-Sultanah and presented him with gifts for his Sultan.

Said bin Sultan of al-Busaid Dynasty 
Said bin Sultan was son of Sultan bin Ahmad, who ruled Oman from 1792 to 1804. Sultan bin Ahmad died in 1804 on an expedition to Basra. He appointed Mohammed bin Nasir bin Mohammed al-Jabry as the Regent and guardian of his two sons, Salim bin Sultan and Said bin Sultan. Sultan's brother Qais bin Ahmad, ruler of Sohar, decided to attempt to seize power. Early in 1805 Qais and his brother Mohammed marched south along the coast to Muttrah, which he easily captured. Qais then started to besiege Muscat. Mohammed bin Nasir tried to bribe Qais to leave, but did not succeed.

Mohammed bin Nasir called on Badr bin Saif for help. After a series of engagements, Qais was forced to retire to Sohar. Badr bin Saif became the effective ruler. Allied with the Wahhabis, Badr bin Saif became increasingly unpopular.To get his wards out of the way, Badr bin Saif made Salim bin Sultan governor of Al Maşna‘ah, on the Batinah coast and Said bin Sultan governor of Barka.

In 1806, Said bin Sultan lured Badr bin Saif to Barka and murdered him nearby. Said was proclaimed ruler of Oman. There are different accounts of what happened, but it seems clear that Said struck the first blow and his supporters finished the job. Said was acclaimed by the people as a liberator from the Wahhabis, who left the country. Qais bin Ahmad at once gave his support to Said. Nervous of the Wahhabi reaction, Said blamed Mohammed bin Nasir for the murder.

Decline 
See:Division of the Omani Empire

References

Sources 

 Cited in: 

Former sultanates
Former countries in the Middle East
19th-century disestablishments
Arab history
17th-century establishments
Former empires
Imperialism
Overseas empires
History of Oman
Former empires in Africa
Former empires in Asia